Cagnoncles is a commune in the Nord department in northern France. It contains 11 Commonwealth war graves from the First World War.

History
Private A S Bullock in his World War I memoir recalls arriving in Cagnoncles around 19 October 1918 to find the population near to starvation, and records that he and his fellow soldiers shared their rations with the local people.

Heraldry

See also
Communes of the Nord department

References

Communes of Nord (French department)